Hakea divaricata, commonly known as needlewood, corkbark tree or fork-leaved corkwood, is a tree or shrub  in the  family Proteaceae native to an area in central Australia. A slow growing species with up to 120 showy cream to greenish-yellow flowers in long racemes from June to November.

Description
Smaller branches are red and smooth, on occasion sparsely or densely covered in soft short hairs. They are thinly covered with soft hairs quickly becoming smooth. The stems are covered in white or dark brown hairs, rarely smooth. The seeds inside take up much of the valve and have a wing halfway down one side.

Taxonomy
Hakea divaricata  was first formally described by the botanist Lawrence Alexander Sidney Johnson in 1962 and  published in Contributions from the New South Wales National Herbarium. The species was often thought to be Hakea eyreana. Synonyms include; Hakea intermedia, Hakea ivoryi and Hakea ivoryi var. glabrescens.
Hakea divaricata belongs to the corkwood group which are often found in drier areas of Australia. Other members include Hakea chordophylla, Hakea ednieana, Hakea eyreana, Hakea fraseri, Hakea ivoryi and Hakea pulvinifera.
The specific epithet (divaricata) is derived from the Latin word divaricatus meaning "spread apart", referring to the spreading of the segments of the leaves.

Distribution and habitat
The needlewood hakea is mostly found in the south of the Northern Territory, the Pilbara and northern Goldfields of Western Australia, south west Queensland and the Far North of South Australia. It is found on red sand plains, around bases of hills and rockholes, on dune swales and along watercourses and grows well in sandy soils around sandstone or limestone. It is often part of open woodland communities, especially  mulga woodlands, and chenopod rich plains.

Uses in horticulture
Hakea divaricata is planted as an ornamental or street tree and is particularly suited to arid areas as it is both frost and drought tolerant. The needlewood hakea is able to resprout epicormically from the lignotuber following fire.
Indigenous Australian peoples have used the plant as a food source especially the fruit flesh, the roots are used as a water source. The gum can be extracted from the tree and the wood used to make weapons, implements and traps. They also extracted honey from the flowers or soaked the flowers in water to produce a sweet drink.

References

divaricata
Flora of the Northern Territory
Flora of South Australia
Flora of Western Australia
Plants described in 1962